In commercial aviation, a red-eye flight is a flight scheduled to depart at night and arrive the next morning. Another definition of a red-eye flight is one that takes place overnight but does not provide enough time for passengers to get a full night's sleep.

The term "red-eye" derives from the symptom of having red eyes, which can be caused by fatigue.

Causes and utilities 
For the airline, overnight flights will enable more use of aircraft that would otherwise be idle at night. For airports, it may be rational to divert the stream of passengers away from peak hours. In major airports, the capacity for flight operations during daytime may be fully exhausted, and the price of airport slots may be higher at peak hours.

For passengers, the benefits and disadvantages are more subjective. Many will perceive it difficult to arrive well-rested after a night flight, especially if it is at odd hours or too short to fit into a full night's sleep. However, the traffic to and from the airport, as well as the airport experience may be less stressful at these hours. Some passengers may want to arrive early in a city and return the same day, saving on a night's accommodation, or enjoy one full day at the beginning or end of the trip. It has been claimed that red-eye flights are popular among business travelers who benefit from flying at night. Business class seats are often reclinable to a flat position, enabling normal sleep.

Examples 

One definition of a red-eye flight is one that is too short to allow a full night's sleep. An example would be those flights from Los Angeles to New York City—about six hours' flying time—that depart between 2200 and 0100, and arrive between 0500 and 0700.

Asia 
Japan Airlines used to operate red-eye flights from Hong Kong to Tokyo Haneda, but they have switched to daytime flights. Cathay Pacific still operates one flight each to Tokyo Narita and Osaka, while All Nippon Airways operates red-eye flights from Hong Kong to Tokyo's Haneda daily.
Asiana, Korean Air, and Cathay Pacific operate red-eye flights from Hong Kong to Seoul. Asiana operates flights to Busan. Cathay Pacific used to fly a red-eye flight from Seoul to Hong Kong, but the flight is now suspended and the airline operates only daytime and evening flights from Seoul to Hong Kong. Cathay Pacific also used to fly a red-eye flight from Hong Kong to Kuala Lumpur, but they changed this to an evening flight, complementing its morning and afternoon flights. 
Cathay Pacific operates many red-eye flights outside of Tokyo and Seoul. These include red-eye flights between Hong Kong and cities in Australia and New Zealand in both directions, as well as between Hong Kong and Singapore. Cathay Pacific flights that are red-eye only in the Hong Kong-bound direction include those from Bangkok. Cathay Pacific flights that are red-eye only from Hong Kong include those to Seoul and parts of Japan. The Vancouver to New York (JFK) tag flight operated by Cathay Pacific is also a red-eye service. 
Flights that leave India and Southwest Asia around midnight arrive in Bangkok, Hong Kong, Kuala Lumpur, and Singapore early morning. 
Philippine Airlines also operates red-eye flights from Korea and Japan back to Manila, which also have regular late-night flights from Manila to Singapore and Kuala Lumpur. 
Many flights from Southeast Asia to Japan, Korea, and China depart in the evenings or around midnight, and land at the destinations in the early morning. There are also flights that depart Japan, Korea, or China around midnight, and arrive in Southeast Asia in the early morning.
Indonesian airlines operate overnight red-eye flights from Jakarta to the easternmost province of Papua. With a flight time of four to five hours and a two-hour time difference, most red-eye flights depart shortly before midnight and arrive around 6am. Garuda Indonesia also operates daily overnight flights to the East Asia's Tokyo, Seoul, and Beijing, leaving Jakarta at midnight and arriving at around 6am the next morning. Garuda Indonesia applies a similar daily overnight flight schedule for its Australia-bound flight routes, departing from Jakarta and Denpasar just before midnight and arriving in Sydney and Melbourne at around 9am the next morning.
Pakistan International Airlines flies red-eye flights to Lahore, Pakistan from Jeddah, Saudi Arabia, as well as flights from Manchester, Birmingham and London to Pakistan.
Turkish Airlines flies red-eye flights to Istanbul, Turkey from Malé, Maldives.
Singapore Airlines flies red-eye flights to Singapore from Malé, Maldives.
Gulf Air flies red-eye flights from Bahrain to Malé, Maldives.

Australia 
The majority of transcontinental flights are operated during the day, but as of 2010, red-eye flights operate from Perth to Sydney, Brisbane, Cairns, Canberra, and Melbourne, and from Darwin to Sydney, Brisbane and Melbourne. Red-eye flights have previously operated from Australia to New Zealand and Fiji.

Red-eye flights to Australia operate from various locations in Southeast Asia and North America, such as Scoot's flights from Singapore to Gold Coast, Sydney, and Melbourne. Jetstar offers red-eye flights between Melbourne and Wellington with the flight departing Melbourne at 1am and arriving in Wellington at 6am.

Another example would be Qantas flights from Los Angeles to Brisbane, Sydney and Melbourne, and flights from Dallas/Fort Worth International Airport to Sydney), generally leaving 10pm to 11pm and arriving from 5am to 8am. While they do fly during the night - this is more a product of large time zone differences - the flights take around 15 hours (giving more time to sleep) and westward flight stretches out the local length of day and night. Furthermore, as the flight crosses the International Date Line, flights arrive roughly 2 days later in local time.

Brazil 
LATAM Brasil, Azul Brazilian Airlines  and Gol Transportes Aéreos all offer red-eye flights in Brazil, popularly known as "Great Owl", because of a film session in a late night broadcast by Rede Globo, with over 50 different routes throughout Brazil, all departing between 10pm and 6am. Usually these flights originate in Brasília, Belo Horizonte, Campinas, Rio de Janeiro, Salvador, or São Paulo and are bound for Manaus, Belém, Porto Velho, Northeast Brazil, North America, Argentina, and Europe.

Europe 
Red-eye flights to Europe were once meant to apply exclusively to the morning arrivals of transatlantic flights from the American East Coast to Western Europe. Such traffic now comprises the busiest of the long-haul air routes. The first of these flights, from the busiest destinations of New York and Washington D.C., will arrive at the major European airports at London Heathrow, Frankfurt, Amsterdam, Paris, and Dublin before 0600 local time (and when still subject to costly night-flying restrictions); and hence in increasing numbers and to and from a wide range of American/European destinations.

Travelling from Europe, red-eye flights are scheduled out of Madrid, Barcelona, Paris, and Frankfurt. The flight time is of three to five hours, with typical departure around midnight, and arrival around dawn the next day. Most airlines from the Middle East and Asia operate red-eye services from major Western European destinations. One example is London Heathrow, where the last departures - leaving between 22.30 and 23.00 - are eastbound medium-haul services to destinations such as Moscow and Tel Aviv.

Russia 
Russian airlines operate similarly to U.S. airlines by connecting Moscow to Yakutsk, Irkutsk, and Vladivostok. They last five to eight hours but due to the northerly latitude the flights can cross as many as eight time zones during this interval, drastically enlarging the time difference. The flights depart Moscow around 6pm and arrive at the eastern cities around 6am the next day. One of the current examples of red-eye flight is Aeroflot's SU783 from Moscow to Magadan, departing 11:05pm Moscow time and arriving 2:00pm Vladivostok Time on the next day, with a flight time of approximately eight hours.

South Africa 
Many medium and long-haul flights to/from South Africa and Europe, other African destinations and the Middle East make use of red-eye flights and longitudinal advantages (similar time zones) so that passengers can arrive at their destinations early in the morning and benefit from minimal time zone changes due to South Africa's geographic position. This makes it an efficient and convenient way to travel between each area.

United States and Canada 
Red-eye flights frequently connect West Coast cities to East Coast cities. These typically depart the West Coast between 10pm and 1am, and have a flight time of three to six hours but gain between two and four hours due to the time difference, arriving on the East Coast between 5am and 7am. American Airlines, United Airlines, Delta Air Lines, Alaska Airlines, Air Canada and other U.S. and Canadian carriers operate red-eye flights that depart from the West Coast at night from cities such as Los Angeles, Vancouver, San Francisco, and Seattle, among others, arriving in Boston, New York, Toronto, Washington, D.C., and other East Coast cities in the morning. Red-eye flights also connect Hawaii or Alaska with West Coast mainland cities. Flights from Tokyo to Honolulu are considered red-eye flights, as the flights are usually overnight flights that are around six hours.

Red-eye flights in popular culture 
Films involving red-eye flights include Airport 1975 (1974), Airplane! (1980), The Langoliers (1995), Turbulence (1997), Red Eye (2005), Flightplan (2005), Snakes on a Plane (2006), and Non-Stop (2014). 

The TV series Into the Night (2020) also includes a red-eye flight in its central premise.

References 

Airline tickets
Night